Carlo Carafa (died 29 September 1608) was a Roman Catholic prelate who served as Bishop of Boiano (1572–1608)
and Bishop of Guardialfiera (1567–1572).

Biography
On 23 May 1567, Carlo Carafa  was appointed during the papacy of Pope Pius V as Bishop of Guardialfiera. 
On 1 June 1567, he was consecrated bishop by Scipione Rebiba, Cardinal-Priest of Sant'Angelo in Pescheria, with Giulio Antonio Santorio, Archbishop of Santa Severina, and Egidio Valenti, Bishop of Nepi e Sutri, serving as co-consecrators. 
On 4 July 1572, he was appointed during the papacy of Pope Gregory XIII as Bishop of Boiano. 
He served as Bishop of Boiano until his death on 29 September 1608.

References

External links and additional sources
 (for Chronology of Bishops) 
 (for Chronology of Bishops) 
 (for Chronology of Bishops) 
 (for Chronology of Bishops) 

16th-century Italian Roman Catholic bishops
17th-century Italian Roman Catholic bishops
Bishops appointed by Pope Pius V
Bishops appointed by Pope Gregory XIII
1608 deaths